Meredith is a closed railway station on the Geelong–Ballarat railway line, located in the township of Meredith, Victoria, Australia. There is a crossing loop at the station, while the station building is used as a residence, and is fenced off from the platform. 

Grain and freight trains use the railway line. Although no V/Line trains serve the station, a number of V/Line road coach services stop in the township each day.

The crossing loop itself was extended in 1987.

References

Disused railway stations in Victoria (Australia)